The AFC U-19 Women's Championship 2013 is the seventh edition of the AFC U-19 Women's Championship. It was played from 11 to 20 October 2013. The top three teams (South Korea, North Korea, and China PR) qualified for the 2014 FIFA U-20 Women's World Cup.

Seedings

Qualification

First qualification round took place from 17 to 24 October 2012. The second round was played from 2 to 9 December 2012. Myanmar won the only qualification spot to the final tournament.

Participating teams

The following teams qualified for the final tournament:

Notes

Format
The teams play each other once. There is no knock-out stage.

If two or more teams are equal on points on completion of the group matches, the following criteria were applied to determine the rankings.
 Greater number of points obtained in the group matches between the teams concerned;
 Goal difference resulting from the group matches between the teams concerned;
 Greater number of goals scored in the group matches between the teams concerned;
 Goal difference in all the group matches;
 Greater number of goals scored in all the group matches;
 Kicks from the penalty mark if only two teams are involved and they are both on the field of play;
 Fewer score calculated according to the number of yellow and red cards received in the group matches;
 Drawing of lots.

Standings
All kick-off times are China Standard time (UTC+08:00).

Winners

Awards 
The following awards were given.

Goalscorers
8 goals
 Jang Sel-gi

5 goals
 Wang Shuang

4 goals
 Ri Un-sim

3 goals
 Choi Yu-ri
 Song Duan

2 goals

 Hayley Raso
 Li Mengwen
 Ayaka Michigami
 Mina Tanaka
 Lee Geum-min
 Kim So-hyang

1 goals

 Amy Harrison
 Chloe Logarzo
 Brittany Whitfield
 Georgia Yeoman-Dale
 Zhu Beiyan
 Lyu Yueyun
 Zhao Xinzhai
 Li Xiang
 Akari Kurishima
 Akari Shiraki
 Ayaka Inoue
 Marin Hamamoto
 Rin Sumida
 Hikaru Naomoto
 Yui Hasegawa
 Kim Inji
 Lee So-dam
 Jon So-yon
 Kim Phyong-hwa
 Choe Chung Bok
 Kim Mi Gyong

References

External links
AFC U-19 Women's Championship by AFC

 
Under
2013
Under
2013 in youth association football